DK2 may refer to:
 Batman: The Dark Knight Strikes Again
 Dungeon Keeper 2
 Donkey Kong 2
 Oculus Rift Developer kit 2
 Droga krajowa 2, a national road in Poland